Swamp candle is the common name for two different plant species:

 Lysimachia terrestris, in the family Primulaceae
 Schoenolirion croceum, in the family Asparagaceae

See also
 Jack o' lantern mushroom
 Swamp beacon
 Swamp lantern